Spur 366, also named Woodall Rodgers Freeway, is a highway that connects Beckley Avenue and Singleton Boulevard in West Dallas to Interstate 35E  and U.S. Highway 75 (North Central Expressway) in central Dallas, Texas. The highway, as part of the downtown freeway loop, also serves as a dividing line between downtown Dallas on the south and the Uptown and Victory Park neighborhoods on the north.

In 2012 the Santiago Calatrava designed Margaret Hunt Hill Bridge was opened, extending Woodall Rodgers west of Interstate 35E across the Trinity River, into West Dallas. The Margaret Hunt Hill Bridge is first of three planned bridges of the Trinity River Project.

Klyde Warren Park, completed in 2012, spans the freeway from Saint Paul Street to Pearl Street, connecting the downtown Arts District with Uptown. The freeway travels in a tunnel under the park.

The highway is named after Woodall Rodgers, a former mayor of Dallas responsible for the construction of Love Field and Central Expressway.

Route description
Spur 366 is often referred to by most locals as Woodall Rodgers Freeway (or simply Woodall Rodgers). The only signage for Spur 366 is on the ramps to the highway at the interchanges with I-35E and US 75/I-45. As such, the highway is signed TO I-35E westbound and TO US 75/I-45 eastbound.

The highway begins at a traffic signal at Beckley Avenue. Westbound traffic can continue past the light onto Singleton Boulevard. After the light, Spur 366 crosses the Trinity River on the Margaret Hunt Hill Bridge. From the bridge, traffic can exit to Riverfront Boulevard (formerly Industrial Boulevard). An incomplete interchange with I-35E (Stemmons Freeway) follows, before the freeway serves as the dividing line between Downtown and Uptown. There are many exits for the next mile, most of which contain multiple ramps to serve different streets. The freeway ends at an interchange with US 75/I-45 in northeast Downtown. The exit ramp to northbound US 75 also serves Hall Street.

Margaret Hunt Hill Bridge

The Margaret Hunt Hill Bridge is a steel bridge that carries Woodall Rodgers Freeway over the Trinity River. This is the first steel bridge across the river. The bridge opened in March 2012 and was designed by Santiago Calatrava.

Klyde Warren Park

Klyde Warren Park is a 5.2-acre park that connects Downtown Dallas with Uptown. The park is located above the freeway (which travels through a tunnel under the park, much like the Papago Freeway Tunnel) between Pearl and St. Paul streets to the west and east, and the frontage roads to the north and south.

History
Like many freeways in the United States, Spur 366 was built through a prominent African-American neighborhood, displacing the population and gentrifying the area.

Spur 366 was built along sections of Cochran and Munger Streets between I-35E and US 75/I-45. Once the freeway opened in 1983, it remained relatively unchanged until the construction of the Margaret Hunt Hill Bridge and Klyde Warren Park in 2012.

Exit list

See also

 List of state highway spurs in Texas

References

External links

 DFWFreeways.info: Spur 366 Woodall Rodgers Freeway History
 Official site: Woodall Rodgers deck park project

366
Highways in Dallas